Ratcliffburg is an unincorporated community in Vinton County, in the U.S. state of Ohio.

History
A post office operated under the name Ratcliffburg(h) between 1850 and 1903. Ratcliffburg once contained a one-room schoolhouse.

References

Unincorporated communities in Vinton County, Ohio
Unincorporated communities in Ohio